Desni may refer to:
Desni, Iran, a village in Golestan Province, Iran
Tamara Desni (1913-2008), British actress
Xenia Desni (1894-1962), Ukrainian actress

See also
 Desni Bajer Lake, in Croatia